Shinga is a village in the Haut-Lomami province of the Democratic Republic of the Congo.  It lies at an elevation of 913 meters near the Mulombotwa River. It is about 30 kilometers by road southeast of the railhead and town of Kabongo.

Notes

Populated places in Haut-Lomami